Pazaryeri District is a district of Bilecik Province of Turkey. Its seat is the town Pazaryeri. Its area is 324 km2, and its population is 10,032 (2021).

Composition
There is one municipality in Pazaryeri District:
 Pazaryeri

There are 24 villages in Pazaryeri District:

 Ahmetler
 Alınca
 Arapdede
 Arpadere
 Bahçesultan
 Bozcaarmut
 Bulduk
 Burçalık
 Büyükelmalı
 Demirköy
 Dereköy
 Dülgeroğlu
 Esemen
 Fıranlar
 Güde
 Gümüşdere
 Günyurdu
 Karadede
 Karaköy
 Kınık
 Küçükelmalı
 Nazifpaşa
 Sarıdayı
 Sarnıç

References

Districts of Bilecik Province